Andrei Aleksandrovich Kruchin (born 6 October 1970 in Yaroslavl) is a former Russian football player.

References

1970 births
Footballers from Yaroslavl
Living people
Soviet footballers
FC Akzhayik players
FC SKA Rostov-on-Don players
FC Rostov players
Russian footballers
FC Shinnik Yaroslavl players
Russian Premier League players
FC Spartak-UGP Anapa players
FC Metallurg Lipetsk players
FC Vityaz Podolsk players
FC Yugra Nizhnevartovsk players

Association football defenders